The State Museum of History of Uzbekistan (Uzbek: Oʻzbekiston tarixi davlat muzeyi), previously known as the National Museum of Turkestan, was founded in 1876. It is located in Tashkent. 

Formerly known as the Lenin Museum, the History Museum of Uzbekistan has since been renovated and more exhibits have been added.

The highlight of the museum is a very well preserved alabaster Buddha relief found from Fayaz Tepe in Termez. There are numerous fragmentary remains of Buddha heads and decorative motifs found from different sites around Termez. These depict Buddhist art of this region which shows remarkable improvement on the last periods of Gandharan Art undergoing changes with regional affinities.

There are also a collection of Stone Age implements from the cave culture of Uzbekistan. The Muslim section of the museum has a collection of calligraphy and regal edicts from the Tamerlane dynasty to the last emirs of Bukhara. There is a collection of ethnic art and costumes from different parts of Uzbekistan.

The collection covers the archaeology, history, numismatics, and ethnography of Uzbekistan.

References

External links 
 State Museum of the History of Uzbekistan (Official site)

Museums in Tashkent
History museums in Uzbekistan
Museums established in 1876
1876 establishments in the Russian Empire